Heechhiem is a Hollow Post mill in Goëngahuizen, Friesland, Netherlands which has been restored to working order. The mill is listed as a Rijksmonument, number 33999.

History

The date that Heechhiem was built is unknown, but it is thought to date from the 18th century.  The earliest date that the mill is known to have been standing is 1820.
 The mill was marked on a map of Smallingerland dated 1848. The mill drained the polder De Boer. The mill was restored in 1954, 1970 and 1977. On 9 November 1978, the mill was sold to Stichting De Fryske Mole. The mill was restored again in 1995. It is maintained in full working order and held in reserve should it be required for drainage purposes.

Description

Heechhiem is what the Dutch describe as an spinnenkop. It is a hollow post mill on a single storey square roundhouse. The mill is winded by tailpole and winch. The roundhouse is clad in pantiles and mill body is covered in vertical boards, while the roof of the mill is boarded horizontally and covered in felt. The sails are carried on a wooden windshaft that carries the 41-cog brake wheel. This drives the wallower (23 cogs) at  the top of the upright shaft. At the bottom of the upright shaft, the crown wheel, which has 33 cogs drives a gearwheel with 29 cogs on the axle of the Archimedes' screw. The axle of the Archimedes' screw is  diameter. It is inclined at 15½°. Each revolution of the screw lifts  of water.

Public access
Heechhiem is open by appointment.

References

Houses completed in 1713
Industrial buildings completed in the 18th century
Windmills in Friesland
Hollow post mills in the Netherlands
Windpumps in the Netherlands
Agricultural buildings in the Netherlands
Rijksmonuments in Friesland
1713 establishments in the Dutch Republic
18th-century architecture in the Netherlands